Mary Booth  (1869–1956) was an Australian physician, clubwoman and welfare worker.

Early life and education 

Mary Booth was born on 9 July 1869 at Burwood, Sydney.

Booth educated in private, at Airlie School and then graduated in Arts from the University of Sydney. She studied medicine at the Edinburgh College of Medicine for Women (graduating in 1899).

Career 
Booth taught at girls' secondary schools and worked as a lecturer for the NSW Department of Public Instruction. In 1910-12 she established the Victorian school for medical service.

Booth was the office bearer and founder of many patriotic associations, including the Friendly Union of Soldiers' Wives and Soldiers' Club in Sydney.

Booth stood unsuccessfully for North Shore as an Independent candidate in 1920. She then failed to gain the nomination in 1922 for the Senate election. She published a monthly magazine Boy Settler; founded the Anzac Fellowship of Women in 1921; and involved in the Dreadnought Scheme.

Awards and honours
 She was awarded an OBE in 1918 for her charitable work.

Death and legacy 
Booth died in 1956. After her death and the sale of her property, the funds were used to initiate the scholarship for women economic students at the University of Sydney. In 1961 the Mary Booth Lookout in Kirribilli was named in her honour. Booth Crescent, in the Canberra suburb of Cook, is named for her.

References 

1869 births
1956 deaths
Australian women medical doctors
Australian medical doctors
Medical doctors from Sydney
19th-century Australian women
20th-century Australian women